Mordellistena suturella is a species of beetle in the genus Mordellistena of the family Mordellidae. It was described by Helmuth in 1864.

References

External links
Coleoptera. BugGuide.

Beetles described in 1864
suturella